Zezé Di Camargo & Luciano 1994, or Zezé Di Camargo & Luciano IV, is the fourth studio album by the Brazilian country music duo Zezé Di Camargo & Luciano, released in 1994, reaching 1.6 million sales across Brazil and winning a diamond disk.

Track listing

Sales and certifications

References

External links
Zezé Di Camargo & Luciano (1994) on CliqueMusic

Zezé Di Camargo & Luciano albums
1994 albums
Columbia Records albums